Luciano José Pereira da Silva (born 16 March 1980 in Rio Branco) is a retired Brazilian football (soccer) goalkeeper. He has previously played for Tombense and K.F.C. Germinal Beerschot. Having signed for Eredivisie club FC Groningen, the technical manager of the club, Henk Veldmate, described Luciano as "a spectacular keeper who, because of that, has a lot of risk in his game play".

On 24 February 2010, Luciano de Souza extended his contract with FC Groningen until 2012. On 14 February 2014, Luciano and Groningen agreed to dissolve his contract so he could return to Brazil for a knee surgery.

Honours

Club
Beerschot A.C.
 Belgian Cup: 2004–05

References

1980 births
Living people
Brazilian footballers
Association football goalkeepers
CR Vasco da Gama players
Beerschot A.C. players
FC Groningen players
Belgian Pro League players
Eredivisie players
Brazilian expatriate footballers
Expatriate footballers in Belgium
Brazilian expatriate sportspeople in Belgium
Expatriate footballers in the Netherlands
Brazilian expatriate sportspeople in the Netherlands
Sportspeople from Rio de Janeiro (state)